Momisis longicornis is a species of beetle in the family Cerambycidae. It was described by Pic in 1912. It is known from China, Vietnam, Laos and Borneo.

References

Astathini
Beetles described in 1912